A village is the second smallest settlement unit in Turkey.

Hierarchical model

There are 81 provinces  in Turkey.  The governor of each province is called vali. There are a number of ilçe (district) in each province.  In İstanbul, the most populous province, the number of districts is 39. But in small provinces the number may be as low as 3. In 51 provinces, the capital of the province is also a district known as the central district with the same name. (i.e., The central district of Karaman Province is called Karaman) In 30 provinces however, the capital city is also divided into central districts, all of which have unique names. The total number of districts is 919 (including the 51 central districts). The governor of each district is called kaymakam .

Smaller units
There are more than 30000 villages in Turkey. During the Ottoman Empire era the villages were called karye, but in Turkey they are known as köy. There are several hundred villages in each province. All villages are in the rural areas of the districts. The village heads are called muhtar.
 
During the early years of the Turkish Republic, sub districts called bucak had been established for the villages in remote areas. The center of the sub district was chosen as one of the villages.  Now although they continue as a legal entity in 51 province, they have no administrative function.

Villages as neighborhoods

According to law 6360, beginning by 2013 in 30 provinces the villages were officially considered as the neighborhoods of the districts.  Thus the municipalities in the district centers were held responsible for the villages also. The number of villages (and subdistricts) which were renamed as neighborhood is 16803. But this legal organization doesn't affect the 18214 villages with a total population of 8.7% in other 51 provinces. Thus the other villages, except for the more populous villages with municipalities of their own,  don't have any municipal services other than what can be carried on by the muhtars.

Gallery
Some examples of Turkish villages (Except Çakırlar and Ayvalı all of them are officially called neighborhood)

References

 
Subdivisions of Turkey